is a Japanese manufacturer of professional broadcast video and audio equipment. Founded more than 50 years ago, FOR-A has spread globally, with subsidiaries in America, Canada, Korea, Italy, United Kingdom, India, Hong Kong, Middle East and Africa.

FOR-A manufactures 4K variable-rate, slow-motion digital video cameras,  digital video switchers, signal processing equipment, broadcast graphics products (such as virtual processors and studios), multi viewers, frame synchronizers and time base correctors, HD/SD converters, and video stabilizers.

History 

FOR-A was established on October 21, 1971, by Keizo Kiyohara in Tokyo, Japan. Its first product was the VTG-32, a worldwide video timer – the success of which allowed for the opening of a FOR-A Corporation of America, established in California. 
In 1977, after producing the FVW-900 (a video writer), the company went on to manufacture the FA-410P, a time-based corrector that was universally recognized as the strongest in the market. From there, FOR-A went on to open locations in Canada, England, Italy, China, and Korea.
By the 1990s, FOR-A was a leading developer of DVE manipulation units, character generators, Time Base Correctors and Frame Rate Converters. In 1994, their character generator (the VWS-100) was chosen for official production display use at the Nagano Olympic Games. FOR-A recently also developed the instant replay/mark entry used by the International Skating Union at all major figure skating events, including the Olympics.

Company Timeline 

1970 – VTG-32 produced.
1974 – FOR-A Corporation of America established in California.
1977 – FVW-900 produced, a video writer allowing for freehand drawing on the screen. 
1981 – FA-410 Produced, widely considered the best TBC on the market at that time.
1985 – FOR-A Research and Development Center opened in Sakura City, Chiba.
1986 – First DVE Manipulation Unit Produced 
1988 – FOR-A Corporation of Canada established in Toronto.
1989 – Sakura R&D Center Expansion Completed
1991 – R&D Center opened in Sapporo City, Hokkaido.
1992 – Video Gainesville Inc. (Florida, USA) acquired to establish overseas development center and expand production.
1993 – VWS-100 selected for official production display use at Nagano Olympic Games
1994 - PC board assembly factory opened at Sakura R&D Center.
1995 - FOR-A (UK) Limited established in London (England). 
1996 - FOR-A Italia S.r.l. established in Milan (Italy). 
1997 - digiWarp designed to add virtual studio systems to product lineup. 
1998 - Headquarters moved to Ebisu in Shibuya-ku, Tokyo (Japan). 
1998 - Extension expansion of Sakura R&D Center completed. 
1999 - 24-hour, 365-day FOR-A service call center established for Japanese market. 
2001 - ISO certification of Sakura R&D Center successfully completed. 
HD and SD versions of HVS-3000 (2M/E Digital Video Switcher) Debuts to acclaim at IBC2001.
New headquarters building completed in Ebisu in Shibuya-ku, Tokyo (Japan).
Special camera related sales and development center completed on Sakura R&D grounds.
2004 - FOR-A Corporation of Korea established in Seoul. 
2010 - Introduced LTR-100HS Video Archive Recorder with LTO-5 and LTFS at NAB trade show (NAB-2010)

Associated Companies

 FOR-A Corporation of America
 FOR-A Latin America, Incorporated
 FOR-A Corporation of Canada
 FOR-A UK Limited
 FOR-A Italia S.r.l
 FOR-A Corporation of Korea
 EXA International Co., Ltd.
 FOR-A MFG. Co., Ltd.
 FOR-A System Service Co., Ltd.
 WIZ Co., Ltd.
 Towa Air Transport System Ltd.
 FOR-A KIKAKU Co., Ltd.
 VIF Co., Ltd.
 Idea Institute Inc.
 Vanguard International Foods Co., Ltd.

Trivia

The company name, "FOR-A", is derivative of a similar—sounding Japanese phrase ("Han'ei") meaning "Prosperity with friends".

References

External links
FOR-A Global Official Site

Electronics companies of Japan
Film and video technology
Manufacturing companies established in 1971
Electronics companies established in 1971
Japanese brands
Japanese companies established in 1971
1992 mergers and acquisitions
Shibuya
Sakura, Chiba